Pablo Milad Abusleme (born 15 February 1964) is a Chilean politician and leader who currently serves as president of the Asociación Nacional de Fútbol Profesional (ANFP).

References

Living people
1964 births
Intendants of Maule Region
Presidents of the ANFP
Evópoli politicians
21st-century Chilean politicians
Metropolitan University of Technology alumni
People from Viña del Mar
Chilean people of Palestinian descent